Steve "Melch" Melcher is an American comedian, television writer, and creator of the syndicated panel That Is Priceless which provides humorous titles for famed paintings.

References

External links

American male comedians
21st-century American comedians
American television writers
American male television writers
American comics writers
Living people
Year of birth missing (living people)
21st-century American screenwriters
21st-century American male writers